Verrucomorpha is an order of asymmetrical sessile barnacles in the class Thecostraca. They are typically found in deeper and deep-sea habitats. There are 2 families and more than 100 described species in Verrucomorpha.

Families
These families belong to the order Verrucomorpha:
 Order Verrucomorpha Pilsbry, 1916
 Family Verrucidae Darwin, 1854
 Genus Altiverruca Pilsbry, 1916
 Genus Brochiverruca Zevina, 1993
 Genus Cameraverruca Pilsbry, 1916
 Genus Costatoverruca Young, 1998
 Genus Cristallinaverruca Young, 2002
 Genus Gibbosaverruca Young, 2002
 Genus Globuloverruca Young, 2004
 Genus Metaverruca Pilsbry, 1916
 Genus Newmaniverruca Young, 1998
 Genus Rostratoverruca Broch, 1922
 Genus Spongoverruca Zevina, 1987
 Genus Verruca Schumacher, 1817
 Genus †Priscoverruca Gale, 2014
 Genus †Youngiverruca Gale, 2014
 Family †Eoverrucidae Gale, 2020
 Genus †Eoverruca Withers, 1935

References

Further reading

 

Barnacles